Final results for the Boxing competition at the 1986 Commonwealth Games in Edinburgh, Scotland, from 24 July to 2 August.

Light Flyweight (– 48 kg)

Flyweight (– 51 kg)

Bantamweight (– 54 kg)

Featherweight (– 57 kg)

Lightweight (– 60 kg)

Light Welterweight (– 63.5 kg)

Welterweight (– 67 kg)

Light Middleweight (– 71 kg)

Middleweight (– 75 kg)

Light Heavyweight (– 81 kg)

Heavyweight (– 91 kg)

Super Heavyweight (> 91 kg)

References
 Amateur Boxing

1986 Commonwealth Games events
1986
Commonwealth Games
International boxing competitions hosted by the United Kingdom